The 1945 Chatham Cup was the 18th nationwide knockout football competition in New Zealand, and the first such competition after a four-year gap caused by World War II. 

The competition was run on a regional basis, with regional associations each holding separate qualifying rounds. Teams taking part in the final rounds are known to have included Wellington Marist, St. Andrews (Manawatu), Western (Christchurch), and Mosgiel.

The 1945 final
In the final, Jack Smith scored a hat-trick, including one goal from the penalty spot. Merv Gordon's own goal is the first to be definitively recorded as such in a Chatham Cup final, though some goals in earlier finals are regarded as own goals in some publications. The game is noted as an exciting one, especially the second half. The only goal of the first half came after 17 minutes from Marist's G. Irvine. The lead became 2-0 twenty minutes into the second half through Ray Price, only for Western to score twice, the second goal coming only one minute before the whistle. In extra time Gordon's own goal was nullified by an equaliser from Ray Dowker before Smith hit the winner from the penalty spot.

Results

Semi-finals

Final

References

Rec.Sport.Soccer Statistics Foundation New Zealand 1945 page

Chatham Cup
Chatham Cup
Chatham Cup